Coleophora astericola is a moth of the family Coleophoridae. It is found in the United States, including Massachusetts.

The larvae feed on the leaves of Aster multiflorus. They create a tubular, bivalved silken case.

References

astericola
Moths described in 1920
Moths of North America